Allison Tower, formerly Anadarko Tower, is a 32-story,  skyscraper located in The Woodlands, Texas. It is currently the tallest building in Montgomery County, Texas and the tallest building between Houston and Dallas. It also was the first office complex in The Woodlands, Texas to achieve LEED (Leadership in Energy and Environmental Design) certification by the U.S. Green Building Council as verification that the facility meets the highest green building and performance measures. The Anadarko Tower also has earned the Energy Star Award from the U.S. Environmental Protection Agency for its savings on energy consumption.

Overview 
The tower was designed by the architect firm Gensler, and was developed by Patrinely Group. Construction was harsh because Marek Brothers Systems were given an aggressive 12-month deadline. The  tower now serves as offices for Occidental Petroleum and is currently owned by Anadarko Realty Company.

Name Change
An adjacent tower is located next to Allison (Anadarko) Tower to accommodate Anadarko's manpower expansion.  During a Summer of 2013 "Topping Off" Ceremony Anadarko Tower was renamed Allison Tower for Robert Allison, Jr., the first CEO of Anadarko Petroleum. The new tower is dedicated to James Hackett, another former Anadarko Petroleum CEO, and deemed Hackett Tower.

References

 https://web.archive.org/web/20090407050523/http://www.marekbros.com/projects/Anadarko1.html
 http://www.bizjournals.com/houston/stories/2002/03/04/focus5.html
 Emporis.com
 https://images.google.com/images?hl=en&biw=1130&q=anadarko+tower&gbv=2&aq=f&oq=&aqi

Skyscrapers in Texas
Skyscraper office buildings in Texas
Office buildings completed in 2002
Gensler buildings